What a Wonderful World is an album by Canadian artist Anne Murray. It was released by StraightWay Records on EMI Music Canada's behalf in October 1999. The album hit No. 1 on the Billboard Christian Albums chart, her only No. 1 on any American album chart. It was certified Platinum by the RIAA, her highest selling album since 1981's Christmas Wishes.

Track listing

Personnel 
 Anne Murray – vocals, backing vocals 
 Doug Riley – acoustic piano, organ, string arrangements and conductor (6, 8, 12, 13, 19, 22, 25)
 Steve Sexton – keyboards, organ, string arrangements and conductor (4, 5, 10, 11, 14)
 Tommy West – keyboards, organ, backing vocals, vocals (4)
 Mike "Pepe" Francis – acoustic guitar, electric guitar, mandolin
 Aidan Mason – acoustic guitar, electric guitar, classical guitar, slide guitar 
 Peter Bleakney – bass, fretless bass 
 Peter Cardinali – bass, string arrangements and conductor(1, 2, 3, 16, 26)
 Gary Craig – drums, percussion
 Barry Keane – drums, percussion 
 Brian Barlow – percussion, marimba, vibraphone
 Vern Dorge – alto saxophone, soprano saxophone 
 Richard Armin – cello
 Steve Dann – viola 
 Adele Armin – violin 
 Marie Berard – violin
 Dawn Cumberbatch – backing vocals
 Rique Franks – backing vocals 
 Tuku Matthews – backing vocals 
 Amy Sky – backing vocals 
 Dawn Langstroth – vocals (7), backing vocals (12, 15, 21)
 Colina Phillips – additional vocals (24), vocal arrangements (24)
 Jackie Richardson – additional vocals (24)
 Sharon Lee Williams – additional vocals (24)
 Vivian Williams – additional vocals (24)

Production 
 Anne Murray – producer 
 Tommy West – producer
 L. Stu Young – recording, mixing 
 Joel Kazmi – recording assistant 
 Nick Blagona – mastering 
 Raine Munro – production assistant
 Michael Ragogna – production assistant 
 Darlene Sawyer – production assistant 
 Andrew Eccles – cover photography 
 Kathleen Finlay – inside photography 
 Bruce Allen – management

Charts

Weekly charts

Year-end charts

References

1999 compilation albums
Anne Murray compilation albums
EMI Records compilation albums